Ramashray Prasad Singh Yadav (25 March 1924 – 5 December 2015) was an Indian politician. He was elected to four terms 6th, 7th, 8th and 9th to the Lok Sabha, the lower house of the Parliament of India from the Jahanabad in Bihar as a member of the Communist Party of India, and twice elected member of Bihar assembly from Ghosi constituency.

References

External links
Official biographical sketch in Parliament of India website

1924 births
2015 deaths
Communist Party of India politicians from Bihar
India MPs 1996–1997
India MPs 1991–1996
India MPs 1989–1991
India MPs 1984–1989
Lok Sabha members from Bihar
People from Jehanabad district
Bihar MLAs 1967–1969
Bihar MLAs 1972–1977